This is a list of 96 genera in the family Sciaridae, dark-winged fungus gnats.

Sciaridae genera

 Acuatella  c g
 Aerumnosa  c g
 Afrosciara  c g
 Allopnyxia  c g
 Amesicrium  c g
 Angustosciara  c g
 Apelmocreagris  c g
 Archicratyna  c g
 Austrosciara  c g
 Baeosciara Tuomikoski, 1960 g
 Brachisia  c g
 Bradysia Winnertz, 1867 i c g b
 Bradysiopsis  c g
 Camptochaeta  c g
 Cesathrix  c g
 Chaetosciara  i c g
 Claustropyga  c g
 Corynoptera  i c g
 Cottia  c g
 Cratyna  c g
 Ctenosciara  c g
 Dichopygina  c g
 Dodecasciara  c g
 Dolichosciara  c g
 Edidapus  i
 Epidapus (Epidapus) unistylatus Röschmann & Mohrig, 1995 c g b
 Eugnoriste Coquillett, 1896 i c g b
 Euricrium  c g
 Eurobradysia  c g
 Eurysciara  c g
 Faratsiho  c g
 Gephyromma  c g
 Hermapterosciara  c g
 Hybosciara  c g
 Hyperlasion Schmitz i c g
 Keilbachia  c g
 Leptosciarella  c g
 Leucosciara  c g
 Lobosciara  c g
 Lycoriella  i c g
 Manusciaria  c g
 Manzumbadoa  c g
 Merianina  c g
 Metangela  i c g
 Mixosciaritis Hong, 2002 g
 Moehnia  i c g
 Mohrigia  c g
 Mouffetina Frey, 1942 g
 Nahua  c g
 Neophnyxia  c g
 Neozygoneura  c g
 Odontosciara Rübsaamen, 1908 i c g b
 Ostroverkhovana  c g
 Parapnyxia  c g
 Pelliciplanta  c g
 Peniosciara  c g
 Peyerimhoffia Kieffer, 1903,1910 g
 Phorodonta Coquillett, 1910 g
 Phytosciara  i c g
 Plastosciara  i
 Pnyxia Johannsen, 1912 i c g b
 Pnyxiopalpus  c g
 Pnyxiopsis  c g
 Prosciara Frey, 1942 g
 Protosciara Quiévreux, 1938 g
 Pseudoaerumnosa  c g
 Pseudolycoriella  c g
 Pseudosciara  i c g
 Pseudozygomma  c g
 Pseudozygoneura  c g
 Psilomegalosphys  c g
 Qisciara  c g
 Rhynchomegalosphys  c g
 Rhynchosciara  i c g
 Rubsaameniella Meunier, 1903 g
 Scatopsciara  i c g
 Schwenckfeldina  c g
 Schwenkfeldina  i g
 Sciara Meigen, 1803 i c g b
 Sciarotricha  c g
 Scythropochroa  i c g
 Spathobdella Frey i
 Starkomyia Jaschhof, 2004 g
 Succinosciara Mohrig & Roschmann, 1995 g
 Taiwan  c g
 Tergosciara  c g
 Trichodapus  c g
 Trichomegalosphys  c g
 Trichosciara  c g
 Trichosia  c g
 Trichosillana  c g
 Vulgarisciara  c g
 Xenosciara  c g
 Xylosciara  c g
 Zygoneura Meigen, 1830 i c g b

Data sources: i = ITIS, c = Catalogue of Life, g = GBIF, b = Bugguide.net

References

Lists of insect genera